In the 2022 Croydon London Borough Council election, on 5 May 2022, all 70 members of Croydon London Borough Council, and the Mayor of Croydon, were up for election. The elections took place alongside the local elections in the other London boroughs and elections to local authorities across the United Kingdom. Jason Perry of the Conservative Party narrowly won the mayoral election.

In the previous election in 2018, the Labour Party had maintained its control of the council, winning 41 out of the 70 seats with the Conservative Party forming the council opposition with the remaining 29 seats.

Background

History 

The thirty-two London boroughs were established in 1965 by the London Government Act 1963. They are the principal authorities in Greater London and have responsibilities including education, housing, planning, highways, social services, libraries, recreation, waste, environmental health and revenue collection. Some of the powers are shared with the Greater London Authority, which also manages passenger transport, police and fire.

Since its formation, Croydon has variously been under Labour control, no overall control and Conservative control. Councillors have usually been elected only from the Labour and Conservative parties, with the most recent exceptions being the election of a single Liberal Democrat councillor in the 1998 and 2002 elections. The council has had an overall Labour majority since the 2014 election, in which Labour won forty seats while the Conservatives won thirty. Croydon Council has had 70 seats since the 1978 Council election, with 36 seats required for a majority. New election boundaries were put in place for the most recent council election in 2018, which saw Labour maintain its majority with 41 seats with 44.5% of the vote to the Conservative Party's 29 seats with 40.1% of the vote. The Green Party received 7.7% of the vote and the Liberal Democrats received 5.8% of the vote across the borough, though neither won any seats. The incumbent leader of the council is the Labour councillor Hamida Ali, who has held that position since 2020.

Council term 
In January 2019, a Labour councillor for Norbury and Pollards Hill, Maggie Mansell, died. She had served on the council for twenty-five years. A by-election was held in March 2019 to replace her, which was won by the Labour candidate Leila Ben-Hassell. Ben-Hassell was a local party official who was working as a project manager for the City of London Corporation. A Labour councillor for Fairfield, Niroshan Sirisena, resigned in September 2019. Siresena was under police investigation following a "serious incident". The subsequent by-election on 7 November 2019 was won by the Labour candidate Caragh Skipper on a reduced majority, while the Liberal Democrats more than doubled their share of the vote.

In October 2020, after it became clear that the council was facing financial difficulty, the council leader Tony Newman resigned. The Labour councillor Hamida Ali was chosen by the council's Labour group to replace him. Ali established a new cabinet without Newman, Newman's finance lead Simon Hall who had also resigned, and the sitting cabinet members Stuart Collins, Alison Butler and Paul Scott. In November 2020, Croydon council announced its "de facto bankruptcy" by issuing two section 114 notices. In February 2021, Newman and  Hall were suspended from the Labour party after a report was produced into their conduct in the lead-up to the effective bankruptcy of the council. In March, they both resigned from the council. A Labour councillor for South Norwood, Jane Avis, resigned for personal reasons in March 2021. A Conservative councillor for Kenley, Steve O'Connell, resigned in March 2021 ahead of the 2021 London Assembly election in which he was also standing down as an Assembly Member. A Conservative councillor for Park Hill & Whitgift, Vidhi Mohan, resigned at the same time "due to increasing demands in [his] professional life".

By-elections to replace all five councillors who had resigned were held on 6 May 2021 alongside the 2021 London mayoral election and London Assembly election. Each of the by-elections was won by its ward's incumbent party. Newman's ward, Woodside, elected the Labour candidate Michael Bonello. Simon Hall's ward, New Addington North, elected the Labour candidate Kola Agboola. South Norwood was won by the Labour candidate Louis Carserides. Kenley was won by the Conservative candidate Ola Kolade and Park Hill & Whitgift was won by the Conservative candidate Jade Appleton.

In February 2021, the Labour councillor and former Conservative MP Andrew Pelling called for Ali to resign unless she could "prove that she asked... questions when she was in Newman's cabinet" about a £37.5 million overspend during the refurbishment of Fairfield Halls. Pelling was expelled from the Labour Party after he registered a new political party called Putting Croydon First.

Mayoral referendum 
A campaign group supporting an elected mayor for Croydon called DEMOC started a petition in February 2020, which they submitted to the council in September 2020. The mayoral system would replace the leader-and-cabinet system, whereby the leader of the council is chosen by the majority party or coalition of parties. In January 2021, the council announced that a referendum would be held in October of that year. The government minister Luke Hall said that the council should hold the referendum in May 2021 instead, alongside elections for the Mayor of London and London Assembly. The Labour councillor Sean Fitzsimons defended the choice to hold the referendum in October, saying that the prospective mayor could then be elected alongside the council in May 2022. The council also cited technical limitations about how it could spend money under the terms of the council's section 114 notice which required Hall to amend the law to facilitate the referendum.

The Conservatives, including the Conservative MP Chris Philp, campaigned in favour of an elected mayor. Labour opposed the mayoral system, including both Croydon Labour MPs. The Green Party also opposed the mayoral system, instead advocating a change to the committee system.

The referendum question was "How would you like the London Borough of Croydon to be run?", with the options being "By a leader who is an elected councillor chosen by a vote of the other elected councillors. This is how the council is run now." or "By a mayor who is elected by voters. This would be a change from how the council is run now." The result of the referendum was a large majority in favour of the mayoral system, with more than 80% of valid votes being cast in favour of the change.

Campaign 
Nick Bowes, the chief executive of the Centre for London, wrote that the election would come down to the Labour council mismanaging finances and the national Conservative government's "unpopularity in London", saying that Labour's mayoral candidate, Val Shawcross, would benefit from not being connected to the council\s bankruptcy.

Electoral process 
Croydon, like other London borough councils, elects all of its councillors at once every four years. The previous election took place in 2018. The election took place by first-past-the-post voting in single-member constituencies, while in multi-member constituencies election took place by single non-transferable vote. Each ward is represented by one, two or three councillors. Electors will have as many votes as there are councillors to be elected in their ward, and those with the most votes in each ward will be elected.

In this election, only 1 seat was elected through FPTP which is Park Hill & Whitgift, while the remaining 69 seats were elected through SNTV.

All registered electors (British, Irish, Commonwealth and European Union citizens) living in London aged 18 or over will be entitled to vote in the election. People who live at two addresses in different councils, such as university students with different term-time and holiday addresses, are entitled to be registered for and vote in elections in both local authorities. Voting in-person at polling stations will take place from 7:00 to 22:00 on election day, and voters will be able to apply for postal votes or proxy votes in advance of the election.

Previous council composition

Overall results 

* The Conservative figure includes Jason Perry who was elected Mayor of Croydon. The Mayor of Croydon is a member of Full Council.

{| style="width:85%; text-align:center;"
|+ ↓
|- style="color:white;"
| style="background:; width:47.887%;" | 33 plus Mayor
| style="background:; width:2.817%;" | 2
| style="background:; width:1.408%;" | 1
| style="background:; width:47.887%;" | 34
|-
| 
| 
| 
|

Results by ward 

Statements of persons nominated were published on 6 May 2022. Incumbent councillors seeking re-election are marked with an asterisk (*). Councillors seeking re-election for a different ward are marked with a cross (†).

Addiscombe East

Addiscombe West

Bensham Manor

Broad Green

Coulsdon Town

Crystal Palace and Upper Norwood

Fairfield

Kenley

New Addington North

New Addington South

Norbury and Pollards Hill

Norbury Park

Old Coulsdon

Park Hill and Whitgift

Purley and Woodcote

Purley Oaks and Riddlesdown

Sanderstead

Selhurst

Selsdon and Addington Village

Selsdon Vale and Forestdale

Shirley North

Shirley South

South Croydon

South Norwood

Thornton Heath

Waddon 

Andrew Pelling was previously elected as the Labour candidate.

West Thornton

Woodside

Mayoral election 

The Conservatives selected their council group leader Jason Perry to be their mayoral candidate in October 2021. Labour began their selection process in October 2021. The former deputy mayor of London Val Shawcross was selected as the Labour candidate in December 2021. The Green Party selected Peter Underwood as their candidate in November 2021. The businessperson Farah London, who stood as an independent candidate in the 2021 London mayoral election, was announced as the mayoral candidate for the Taking the Initiative Party.

Mayoral results by ward

Addiscombe East

Addiscombe West

Bensham Manor

Broad Green

Coulsdon Town

Crystal Palace & Upper Norwood

Fairfield

Kenley

New Addington North

New Addington South

Norbury & Pollards Hill

Norbury Park

Old Coulsdon

Park Hill & Whitgift

Purley & Woodcote

Purley Oaks & Riddlesdown

Sanderstead

Selhurst

Selsdon & Addington Village

Selsdon Vale & Forestdale

Shirley North

Shirley South

South Croydon

South Norwood

Thornton Heath

Waddon

West Thornton

Woodside

2022-2026 by elections

External Links
Croydon Ward Map

References 

Council elections in the London Borough of Croydon
Croydon